The Ruthless Stakes is an American open or non-Graded stakes race held yearly since 1974 at Aqueduct Racetrack in Queens, New York City. Run in January, it is a six furlong thoroughbred horse race for three-year-old fillies carrying a weight of 121 pounds (54.9 kg). The Ruthless currently offers a purse of $100,000.

The Ruthless began as a 9 furlong race, with the exception of 1978 and 1979. From 1993 to present it remains at 6 furlongs.

In its 41st running in 2018, the race is named for the Hall of Fame filly, Ruthless, winner of the inaugural Belmont Stakes in 1867.

Winners of the Ruthless Stakes

 2018 – Strategic Dreams (Manuel Franco) (1:27.02)
 2017 – Yorkiepoo Princess (Irad Ortiz Jr.) (1:12.42)
 2016 – Constellation (Irad Ortiz Jr.) (1:10.89)
 2015 – Paulassilverlining (Irad Ortiz Jr.) (1:12.84)
 2014 – Mamdooha (1:12.01)
 2013 – Lady Banks (1:12.14)
 2012 – Agave Kiss (Ryan Curatolo) (1:10.28)
 2011 – Breathoffreshheir (Carlos Marquez Jr.)
 2010 – Indian Burn (Richard Migliore) (1:14.05)
 2009 – Justwhistledixie (Rajiv Maragh) (1:10.81)
 2008 – Dill Or No Dill (Ramon Domínguez) (1:10.91)
 2007 – Golden Dreamer (Norberto Arroyo Jr.) (1:10.26)
 2006 – Silvestris (Eibar Coa) (1:11.20)
 2005 – Megascape (Stewart Elliott) (1:11.45)
 2004 – Baldomera (Anthony Black) (1:13.93)
 2003 – Lizzy Cool (Chuck C. Lopez) (1:10.92)
 2002 – Nice Boots Baby (Mario Pino) (1:10.82) 
 2001 – Xtra Heat (Rick Wilson) (1:11.32) (Multiple Graded Stakes winner, Eclipse Champion Three Year Old Filly, 2001.) 
 2000 – Lorie Darlin (Joe Bravo) (1:11.35)
 1999 – Seeking the Sky (Aaron Gryder) (1:10.20)
 1998 – Cheers and Tears (Oliver Castillo) (1:12.00)
 1997 – Valid Affect (Mike Luzzi) (1:11.00)
 1996 – Winter Melody (Mike McCarthy) (1:11.68)	 
 1995 – Evil's Pic (Mike Luzzi) (1:13.68)
 1994 – Dixie Luck (Filiberto Leon) (1:11.86)
 1993 – Roamin Rachel (Chris Antley) (1:10.91) (Multiple stakes winner)
 1992 – No Race
 1991 – No Race
 1990 – No Race
 1989 – No Race
 1988 – Aptostar (Robbie Davis) (1:50.40) (Grade I winner)
 1987 – Super Cook (Ángel Cordero Jr.) (1:51.60)
 1986 – Stated (Eddie Maple) (1:52.60) (Dynamic Star placed but was disqualified to 3rd for interference)
 1985 – Koluctco's Jill (Robbie Davis) (1:53.60)
 1984 – Given (Mathew J. Vigliotti) (1:53.40)
 1983 – Captivating Grace (Jean-Luc Samyn) (1:52.60)
 1982 – Polite Rebuff (Ángel Cordero Jr.) (1:51.00)
 1981 – Wayward Lass (Cash Asmussen) (1:50.00) (Grade I winner, Eclipse Champion Three Year Old Filly, 1981)
 1980 – Darlin Momma (Jeffrey Fell) (1:54.00)
 1979 – Advance Reason (Vincent Bracciale Jr.) (1:51.40)
 1978 – Bemis Heights (Ron Turcotte) (1:48.00)
 1977 – Road Princess (Jorge Velásquez) (1:45.40) (Grade I winner)
 1976 – Secret Lanvin (Angel Santiago) (1:38.60)
 1975 – Nicosia (Eddie Maple) (1:49.60)
 1974 – Shy Dawn (Michael Hole) (1:51.20)

External links
Aqueduct's Official Website

Horse races in New York City
Flat horse races for three-year-old fillies
Aqueduct Racetrack
1974 establishments in New York City
Recurring sporting events established in 1974